Sybroopsis is a genus of beetles in the family Cerambycidae, containing the following species:

 Sybroopsis discedens (Fairmaire, 1881)
 Sybroopsis subtruncata Breuning, 1949

References

Apomecynini